Walter Reddrop (9 September 1901 – 31 March 1983) was an Australian cricketer. He played two first-class cricket matches for Victoria between 1927 and 1929.

See also
 List of Victoria first-class cricketers

References

External links
 

1901 births
1983 deaths
Australian cricketers
Victoria cricketers
People from Kyneton